John Hugh Graham (April 1, 1835 – July 11, 1895) was an American educator, businessman, Civil War veteran, and politician who served one term as a U.S. Representative from New York from 1893 to 1895.

Early life and education 
Born in Belfast, Ireland, U.K, Graham emigrated in 1836 to the United States with his parents, who settled in Brooklyn, New York. He attended the public schools of Brooklyn.

Civil War 
During the Civil War he was recruited into Company A, 5th New York Heavy Artillery Regiment, and served three years as its captain.

For gallant and meritorious services at Harper's Ferry and in the Shenandoah Valley, Virginia, he was commissioned major and brevetted lieutenant colonel.

Post-war career 
After the war he engaged in the hardware business in Brooklyn, New York.

Congress 
Graham was elected as a Democrat to the Fifty-third Congress (March 4, 1893 – March 3, 1895). He was not a candidate for renomination in 1894.

Death 
He died in Brooklyn, New York, on July 11, 1895. He was interred in Green-Wood Cemetery.

References

1835 births
1895 deaths
Union Army officers
Democratic Party members of the United States House of Representatives from New York (state)
Irish emigrants to the United States (before 1923)
19th-century American politicians